Weir River Farm is a nature reserve located in Hingham, Massachusetts. The property is owned by The Trustees of Reservations. It is located adjacent to the Trustees-owned Whitney and Thayer Woods reservation, and the town-owned Turkey Hill property, which the Trustees manage.

History 
Weir River Farm was the former home of painter Polly Thayer Starr, who gave it to The Trustees of Reservations in 1999.

From June 12, 2021, through June 1, 2022, the farm is the site of a special exhibit entitled "Polly Thayer Starr: Spirit of Discovery". The exhibit is intended to "provide visitors of all ages the opportunity to use imagination and observation to explore nature and celebrate the artist’s remarkable 75-year artistic legacy."

References

External links 
 The Trustees of Reservations: Weir River Farm
 Trail map

The Trustees of Reservations
Open space reserves of Massachusetts
Protected areas of Plymouth County, Massachusetts
1999 establishments in Massachusetts
Protected areas established in 1999